Shane is an ITV sitcom written by and starring Frank Skinner and directed by Audrey Cooke, with the first series originally broadcast in 2004. Reviews were generally poor, but a second series was commissioned. After the second series had been recorded, contract differences between Frank Skinner and ITV arose; the second series has never been broadcast.

An American version of the show was piloted by CBS, with Skinner working as executive producer.

Plot

The show was about the title character, Shane (Skinner), a middle aged taxi driver, and his long suffering family. His wife, Myrtle, is a mature student who enjoys creative writing and amateur dramatics. Their children are daughter Velma, a seventeen-year-old feminist, and son Lenny, a pre-pubescent child who, much to Myrtle's disappointment, shows signs of developing a similar sense of humour to Shane.

Shane's best friend and boss is Bazza, with whom he spends much time down the pub. The barmaid at the pub is Sheila, whom Shane has a keen interest in.

Cast

Regular cast
Frank Skinner - Shane
Elizabeth Berrington - Myrtle
Kelly Scott - Velma
Tony Bignell - Lenny
David Schneider - Bazza
Carli Norris - Sheila

Guest cast
Will Ashcroft - History teacher
Lauren Buglioli - Audrey
Harry Burton - Clive
Robert Cameron - English teacher
Richard Clues - Man with bird
Angela Curren - Compère
Simon Day - Suicidal Man
Edna Dore - Great-gran
Fiona Gillies - Violet
Gerald Home - Crocodile
Seeta Indrani - Fiancée
Rosalind Knight - Gran
Lily Lovett - Amelia
Tanya Moody - Drama teacher
Simon Slater - Gordon
Leon Garner - Sam
Matthew Thomas - Spotty kid
Glenn Wrage - Vet

References

External links
Paramount Comedy guide for Shane

2000s British sitcoms
2004 British television series debuts
2004 British television series endings
ITV sitcoms